Marie Henriëtte Heineken (8 June 1844 – 1 March 1930) was a Dutch painter mainly known for flower still lifes. Her paintings are characterised as impressionist.

Biography

Marie Heineken was born on 8 June 1844 on the Korte Prinsengracht in Amsterdam. She was a cousin of the founder of Heineken During a holiday when she was still a child, she met a painter, and became fascinated with painting. Her earliest work dates from 1859, and she would remain an active painter for the rest of her life.

At the age of 24, she enlisted at the Rijksakademie van beeldende kunsten and was taught by August Allebé. She was later taught by Petrus Franciscus Greive. Heineken painted with watercolour and pastel. The emphasis was on flower still lifes, however she has also painted landscapes, cityscapes and portraits. For most of her life, she was active in Amsterdam except for 1891 to 1897 when she lived in Nieuwer-Amstel. From 1883 onwards, she had several exhibitions in Amsterdam. A part of her work is on display at the Amsterdam Museum. Heineken was a personal friend of Betsy Repelius. When Repelius died in 1921, she left her studio and all equipment to Heineken.

Heineken died on 1 May 1930 at the age of 85 in Amsterdam. In 1994, the Marie Heinekenplein was named after her. The naming is slightly controversial, because the square is located on the former Heineken brewery. Streets are not allowed to be named after living people or companies, and therefore, some people suggest that her name was used as a reference to the former brewery.

References

External links
 

1844 births
1930 deaths
Painters from Amsterdam
19th-century Dutch women artists
20th-century Dutch women artists
Flower artists
Impressionism
Dutch watercolourists